The 1999 Houston Astros season was the 38th season for the Major League Baseball (MLB) franchise in Houston, Texas. The Astros won their third consecutive National League Central division title on the final day of playing regular season games in the Astrodome on October 3. This was the first time they had made the postseason in three straight seasons; they would not do so again until 2019. It was the 35th and final season playing in the Astrodome as their home ballpark.

Offseason
 November 17, 1998: Ken Caminiti was signed as a free agent by the Astros.
 January 19, 1999: Ryan Thompson was signed as a free agent by the Astros.
 January 21, 1999: Alex Diaz was signed as a free agent by the Astros.

Regular season

New stadium

In 1999, the Astros played their final season in the Astrodome as their new stadium was being prepared for play to begin in the 2000 season. The ballpark was first named as Enron Field on April 9, 1999, with naming rights sold to the Houston energy and financial trading company in a 30-year, $100 million deal. Astros management faced a public relations nightmare when the energy corporation went bankrupt in the midst of one of the biggest corporate scandals in American history in 2001, and they bought back the remainder of Enron's thirty years of naming rights for $2.1 million, renaming the ballpark as Astros Field on February 7, 2002. The field was unofficially known as "The Field Formerly Known As Enron" by fans and critics alike, in wake of the Enron scandal. On June 5, 2002, Houston-based Minute Maid, the fruit-juice subsidiary of Coca-Cola, acquired the naming rights to the stadium for 28 years at a price exceeding $100 million.

Based on its downtown location next to the old Union Station buildings, one of the suggested names (and nicknames) is the Ballpark at Union Station, or the BUS. During its days as Enron Field, it was also dubbed "Ten-Run" or "Home Run" Field due to its cozy left-field dimensions. In keeping with this theme while paying homage to its current sponsor, the nickname "The Juice Box" is colloquially used today.

Overview
On April 21, Jeff Bagwell hit three home runs in a 10–3 win against the Chicago Cubs at Wrigley Field, his second career three-home run game.  The second home run allowed him to surpass Jimmy Wynn as the Astros' all-time home run leader at 224 and he tied a career-high in one game with six runs batted in (RBI).  He produced another three-home run game on June 9 against the Chicago White Sox.  He was also a grand slam short of hitting for the "home run cycle," with a solo home run, a three-run home run, and a two-run home run, respectively.  The two three-home run games made him the only player to accomplish this feat at two different stadiums in Chicago in the same season.

On August 20, Bagwell walked a major-league record six times in a 16-inning game against the Florida Marlins.

Season standings

Record vs. opponents

Notable transactions
 August 3, 1999: Josh Dimmick (minors) was traded by the Astros to the Minnesota Twins for George Williams.
 August 31, 1999: Alex Diaz was released by the Astros.

Roster

Player stats

Batting

Starters by position 
Note: Pos = Position; G = Games played; AB = At bats; H = Hits; Avg. = Batting average; HR = Home runs; RBI = Runs batted in

Other batters 
Note: G = Games played; AB = At bats; H = Hits; Avg. = Batting average; HR = Home runs; RBI = Runs batted in

Pitching

Starting pitchers 
Note: G = Games pitched; IP = Innings pitched; W = Wins; L = Losses; ERA = Earned run average; SO = Strikeouts

Other pitchers 
Note: G = Games pitched; IP = Innings pitched; W = Wins; L = Losses; ERA = Earned run average; SO = Strikeouts

Relief pitchers 
Note: G = Games pitched; W = Wins; L = Losses; SV = Saves; ERA = Earned run average; SO = Strikeouts

National League Divisional Playoffs

Atlanta Braves vs. Houston Astros
Atlanta wins series, 3-1

Farm system

References

External links
1999 Houston Astros season at Baseball Reference

Houston Astros seasons
Houston Astros season
National League Central champion seasons
Houston Astros